Kadri Bazi Breza (1880–1943) was an Albanian freedom fighter during the Albanian National Awakening. He is known for beheading Serbian officer Bašić.

Life 
Kadri Bazi Breza was a ethnic Albanian, born in the village Brezë, located in the Karadak region. Before the First Balkan War, he participated in the Battle of Kaçanik and the Capture of Skopje by Albanian troops during the Albanian Uprising of 1912. During the First Balkan War, Serbian forces captured Villages in the Karadak region, under them Kadri Breza's village. During that time a Serbian officer named Bašić with his unit composing of 300 men committed murders in the village, it was there when Bašić wanted to rape a local girl. Kadri Breza heard the cries for help by the local girl and armed with a axe approached the Serbian commander, beheading him in front of all his men. Surprised by this, the entire Serbian unit fled the village. Kadri Breza then went into hiding in the mountains, where he was never caught by the Serbian Authorities.

Legacy 
In Karadak Kadri Bazi Breza is celebrated as a hero, who defended the Honour of the Albanians.  

A Monument to him is located in his home village of Brezë.

The Hasanbeg-Aračinovo road is named after him.

References 

1880 births
1943 deaths
Kosovo Albanians
Activists of the Albanian National Awakening